Maria Sheilah Honrado Lacuna–Pangan (born May 6, 1965), publicly known as Honey Lacuna, is a Filipino physician and politician who is currently serving as the Mayor of Manila since 2022.

Early life
Lacuna-Pangan was born May 6, 1965 to Danilo "Danny" Lacuna, a lawyer who would later serve as a city councilor (1967–1975) and vice mayor of Manila (1970–1971; 1988–1992; 1998–2007), and Melanie Honrado, a former Philippine National Bank (PNB) executive. She earned a biology degree at the University of Santo Tomas, earned a Doctor of Medicine degree from De La Salle University – Emilio Aguinaldo College, passed the physician board examination in 1992, and completed her residency training in dermatology at the Ospital ng Maynila Medical Center. Soon after taking her residency training for dermatology at the Ospital ng Maynila Medical Center, she eventually became a fellow of the Philippine Dermatological Society.

Career
A general practitioner with specialization in dermatology by profession, Lacuna worked as a resident physician of the dermatology department of Ospital ng Maynila Medical Center from 1992 to 1995 and as the public health center physician under the Manila Health Department from 1995 to 2004. As the latter, she was assigned at the Bacood Health Center in Santa Mesa and later at the Tondo Health Center in Tondo. Her father, then Vice Mayor Danny Lacuna, then tasked her to head the medical team of his office's regular medical and dental mission conducted every week in various depressed communities in Manila.

She served as the Acting City Social Welfare Officer of Manila from 2013 to 2015. Even as a politician, Lacuna continued her door-to-door visit to patients that she has been doing since before entering politics.

Political career

Lacuna then entered politics when she substituted a candidate for councilor in the 4th district of Manila who withdrew from the race ahead of the 2004 city elections. She ran under the ticket of her father, who was the running mate of former mayor Mel Lopez of Koalisyon ng Nagkakaisang Pilipino. She then won, serving as a Manila city councilor from the 4th district for three consecutive terms from 2004 to 2013. As councilor, she served in the minority whip from 2004 to 2007, chairperson of the Committee on Education, a member of 38 committees, and majority floor leader, the first woman to be named so. She also authored, among others, the following:
Ordinance No. 8095 designating Bicycle and Motorcycle Lanes in the main thoroughfares in Manila;
Ordinance No. 8179 creating the Manila AIDS Council for the prevention and control of sexually transmitted infections;
Ordinance No. 8117 mandating all business establishments, private and public offices in the City of Manila, including schools to require all their applicants and employees to submit to drug testing and to conduct unannounced drug tests on all their employees at least once a year; and
Ordinance No. 8102 requiring the city’s hymn (Awit ng Maynila) in all flag ceremonies of schools, offices and other institutional/official programs and in the opening of any and all official gatherings in Manila.

In the 2016 city election, she was chosen as the running mate of incumbent mayor Joseph Estrada, who was seeking re-election under Pwersa ng Masang Pilipino (PMP); she then won the vice mayoralty race. She became the first woman to be elected vice mayor since the post became an elective position. She was then reelected in 2019, this time as the running mate of her predecessor Francisco "Isko Moreno" Domagoso, who was running for mayor under Asenso Manileño. During the COVID-19 pandemic, she stood as a point person for Moreno in coordinating with the hospital directors of Manila, applying her expertise as a medical doctor. In 2021, she joined Aksyon Demokratiko and was named as the party's Vice-President for Internal Affairs and National Executive Board Member.

 
With Isko Moreno running for president in 2022, Lacuna was nominated by Asenso Manileño to run for mayor in 2022 to succeed him, with Manila's 3rd district representative Yul Servo Nieto as her running mate and vice mayoralty candidate. She won the race by a huge margin over her closest rival, Atty. Alex Lopez, making her the first-ever female to be elected mayor of Manila in 450 years. She was inaugurated before outgoing mayor Moreno on June 29, 2022 at the Manila Cathedral, but only officially started her term on the next day, succeeding him. As mayor, she vowed to prioritize health care and expand Moreno's programs.

On August 5, 2022, Lacuna was conferred with a degree of Doctor of Public Administration, honoris causa by the Pamantasan ng Lungsod ng Maynila.

Personal life
Lacuna is married to Arnold "Poks" Martin Pangan, a fellow physician and registered social worker who is the incumbent City Health Officer of Manila, a former acting City Social Welfare Department Head of Manila, and a 2013 candidate for Manila councilor from the 4th district. They have one daughter.

References

External links 

 Official website of the City of Manila, Mayor section

|-

|-

|-

|-

1965 births
Living people
Pwersa ng Masang Pilipino politicians
Nacionalista Party politicians
National Unity Party (Philippines) politicians
Aksyon Demokratiko politicians
Manila City Council members
Mayors of Manila
Filipino women medical doctors
Filipino dermatologists
Filipino public health doctors
Metro Manila city and municipal councilors
Medical doctors from Manila
Women public health doctors